The 1913 election for Mayor of Los Angeles took place on May 6, 1913, with a run-off election on June 3, 1913. George Alexander had retired from the job and police judge Henry H. Rose was elected over Los Angeles City Attorney John W. Shenk.

Municipal elections in California, including Mayor of Los Angeles, are officially nonpartisan; candidates' party affiliations do not appear on the ballot.

Election 
With the retirement of incumbent George Alexander, the seat was now open. Los Angeles City Attorney John W. Shenk, previous election candidate Job Harriman, and police judge Henry H. Rose ran in the primary. Shenk, Good Government Organization politician, was nominated and endorsed by the Municipal Conference while Harriman was again nominated by the Socialist Party. In the primary election, Harriman was eliminated when Independent politician Henry H. Rose led him by a small margin, meaning he would face Shenk in the general election.

In the runoff, many African-American newspapers urged the election of Rose due to Shenk's decision against C. W. Holden that caused discrimination against African-Americans. In the runoff, Rose won against Shenk at a time where African-Americans represented about fifteen thousand votes.

Results

Primary election

General election

References and footnotes

External links
 Office of the City Clerk, City of Los Angeles

1913
1913 California elections
Los Angeles
1910s in Los Angeles